is a Japanese actress and singer. She has appeared in more than 50 films since 1974.

Selected filmography

Film

Television

Awards

References

External links
 

1951 births
Living people
Singers from Tokyo
Japanese film actresses
Japanese television actresses
Japanese women singers